Espen Haavardsholm (born 10 February 1945, in Oslo) is a Norwegian novelist, poet, biographer and essayist. He made his literary debut in 1966 with the collection of short stories, Tidevann. He was one of the central writers in the modernist literary magazine Profil. He has written biographies on Martin Linge (his grandfather), Aksel Sandemose and Johan Borgen.

Awards 
Gyldendal's Endowment 1970
Aschehoug Prize 2006.

References

1945 births
Living people
20th-century Norwegian novelists
21st-century Norwegian novelists
Norwegian male poets
Norwegian essayists
Norwegian male novelists
Male essayists
20th-century essayists
21st-century essayists
20th-century Norwegian male writers
21st-century Norwegian male writers